Phyllonorycter ulmi is a moth of the family Gracillariidae. It is known from Japan (Hokkaido island), Korea and the Russian Far East.

The wingspan is 5–6 mm.

The larvae feed as leaf miners on Ulmus davidiana var. japonica, Ulmus japonica, Zelkova serrata and Ulmus laciniata. The mine is ptychonomous and created on the upper surface of the leaves.

References

ulmi
Moths of Japan
Moths of Asia

Moths described in 1963
Taxa named by Tosio Kumata
Moths of Korea
Insects of Russia